Emil Ovtcharov (born 15 March 1973) is a retired Bulgarian footballer who played as a goalkeeper. Over the course of his playing days he represented Haskovo, Marek Dupnitsa, and Dobrudzha Dobrich.

References

1973 births
Living people
Bulgarian footballers
Association football goalkeepers
PFC Marek Dupnitsa players
PFC Dobrudzha Dobrich players
FC Haskovo players
First Professional Football League (Bulgaria) players